Amirabad-e Pain may refer to:
 Amirabad-e Pain, Kerman
 Amirabad-e Pain, alternate name of Amirabad, Anbarabad, Kerman Province
 Amirabad-e Pain, Kohgiluyeh and Boyer-Ahmad
 Amirabad-e Pain, South Khorasan